Surf Nicaragua is an EP from Arizona thrash metal band, Sacred Reich. It was released on October 4, 1988 on Metal Blade Records and follows the band's debut album, Ignorance, released the previous year.

The EP contains a cover version of the Black Sabbath song, "War Pigs", which also appeared on the band's next EP, Alive at the Dynamo in 1989, in live form. The song "Surf Nicaragua" contains a part from the song "Wipe Out" as well as the drum part from the Hawaii 5-0 theme song. The live tracks "Ignorance" and "Death Squad" were only supposed to be on the CD version, but due to a pressing error, they appeared on all formats.

Heavy metal band Soulfly covered the song "One Nation" on their 2002 album, 3.

Track listing

Credits
 Phil Rind – bass, vocals
 Wiley Arnett – lead guitar
 Jason Rainey – rhythm guitar
 Greg Hall – drums
 Produced by Bill Metoyer and Sacred Reich
 Cover art by Paul Stottler

References

External links
Metal Blade release page
Sacred Reich Official Website
BNR Metal discography page
Encyclopaedia Metallum release page

1988 EPs
Sacred Reich albums
Metal Blade Records EPs
Thrash metal EPs